Hossam Salama (born 15 November 1983), also known as Hossam Paulo, or simply Paulo, is an Egyptian footballer who plays for Egyptian side Tersana as a forward.

Honours

Zamalek
Egyptian Super Cup: 2016

Individual
Egyptian Premier League top goalscorer (2): 2014–15 (20 goals), 2015–16 (17 goals).

References

External links

1983 births
Living people
Egyptian footballers
Egypt international footballers
Association football forwards
People from Qalyubiyya Governorate
Egyptian Premier League players
Smouha SC players
Zamalek SC players
El Dakhleya SC players
Al Ittihad Alexandria Club players
Al Mokawloon Al Arab SC players
El Shams SC players
Tala'ea El Gaish SC players
Tersana SC players